In molecular biology, CD18 (Integrin beta chain-2) is an integrin beta chain protein that is encoded by the ITGB2 gene in humans. Upon binding with one of a number of alpha chains, CD18 is capable of forming multiple heterodimers, which play significant roles in cellular adhesion and cell surface signaling, as well as important roles in immune responses. CD18 also exists in soluble, ligand binding forms. Deficiencies in CD18 expression can lead to adhesion defects in circulating white blood cells in humans, reducing the immune system's ability to fight off foreign invaders.

Structure and function 
The ITGB2 protein product is CD18. Integrins are integral cell-surface proteins composed of an alpha chain and a beta chain, and are crucial for cells to be able to efficiently bind to the extracellular matrix. This is especially important for neutrophils, as cellular adhesion plays a large role in extravasation from the blood vessels.  A given chain may combine with multiple partners resulting in different integrins.

The known binding partners of CD18 are CD11a, CD11b, CD11c and CD11d. Binding of CD18 and CD11 results in the formation of Lymphocyte Functions Associated Antigen 1 (LFA-1), a protein found on B cells, all T cells, macrophages, neutrophils and NK cells. LFA-1 is involved in adhesion and binding to antigen presenting cells through interactions with the surface protein ICAM-1

Binding of CD18 and CD11b-d results in the formation of complement receptors (e.g. Macrophage-1 antigen receptor, Mac-1, when bound to CD11b), which are proteins found largely on neutrophils, macrophages and NK cells. These complement receptors participate in the innate immune response by recognizing foreign antigen peptides and phagocytizing them, thus destroying the antigen.

Clinical significance 
In humans, lack of functional CD18 causes Leukocyte Adhesion Deficiency, a disease defined by a lack of leukocyte extravasation from blood into tissues, which is the inability of circulating leukocytes to respond to foreign bodies present in the tissue. This subsequently reduces the ability of the individual's immune system to fight off infection, making them more susceptible to foreign infection than those with functional CD18 proteins. The beta 2 integrins have also been found in a soluble form, meaning they are not anchored into the plasma membrane of the cell, but rather exist outside of the cell in the plasma, and are capable of ligand binding. The soluble beta 2 integrins are ligand binding and plasma levels are inversely associated with disease activity in the autoimmune disease spondyloarthritis.

Interactions 
CD18 has been shown to interact with:

 FHL2, 
 GNB2L1,
 ICAM-1,  and
 PSCD1.

See also 
 leukocyte adhesion deficiency
 integrin

References

Further reading

External links 
 
ITGB2 Info with links in the Cell Migration Gateway 
 

Integrins
Clusters of differentiation